Absalom Shabangu (born 2 September 1952) is a Swazi weightlifter. He competed in the men's light heavyweight event at the 1988 Summer Olympics.

References

1952 births
Living people
Swazi male weightlifters
Olympic weightlifters of Eswatini
Weightlifters at the 1988 Summer Olympics
Place of birth missing (living people)